Pioneer Pekao is a Polish company managing several investment funds in Poland. It is the biggest and first investment funds manager on the Polish market.

It is currently active under the brand Pioneer Pekao Investment Funds Company (Pioneer Pekao Towarzystwo Funduszy Inwestycyjnych SA). It is a member of Unicredit banking group.

Market position 
Pioneer Pekao is currently the largest investment funds manager in Poland with about one-sixth of the whole Polish investment funds market (as of 2011 February month end: 17 807 187 PLN thousands - ca 15% market share), with a wide range of products.

It has 17 investment funds, of which three are umbrella funds. In total it makes 34 separate portfolios under management.

Pioneer Pekao Investments is a member of Pioneer Group Asset Management, the global investment arm of Unicredito Italiano which is active in Poland as Bank Polska Kasa Opieki SA.

The company was established in 1992 by the Boston, USA, based portfolio manager Pioneer Investments Management), which launched its first US mutual fund in 1928. The first Polish investment fund (then known as 'mutual fund') was launched in July 1992. The fund was named Pioneer Pierwszy Polski Fundusz Powierniczy (Pioneer First Polish Mutual Fund), now 'Pioneer Balanced', a subfund of the umbrella Pioneer Open-Ended Investment Fund.

After the takeover of the US-based Pioneer Group by Unicredito Italiano and in line with ownership changes in Poland in 2001, Pioneer TFI has been merged with Pekao TFI (the fund manager in the Pekao group, established in 1996). Since the merger date, there are nine funds, five Pioneer and four Eurofundusz (earlier Pekao-Alliance).

The company was established in 1992 by William Smith Jr, a representative of Pioneer Group, who managed the company at the beginning, and drew the picture of the whole organization (fund, fund manager, transfer agent, custodian bank); Krzysztof A. Sikorski, the first fund manager; Robert Sass, who created the distribution channels and co-operation with some Polish banks; Zbigniew Czumaj, who developed fund accounting and administration and is now the funds chief accountant and commercial proxy of the company; Bolesław Meluch; Tomasz Orlik, current vice-president of the executive board who created a model of custody service of Bank Pekao; Krystyna Kisiel, co-ordinating successful transfer agency.

Some of fund managers are Krzysztof Sikorski, Paweł Wilkowiecki, Jarosław Skorulski, Victor Perel, Piotr Dalkowski, Piotr Rzeźniczak, Cezary Iwański, Piotr Lubczyński, Mariusz Adamiak, Hung Le-Tu, Ryszard Trepczyński and Hubert Kmiecik.

Company presidents: William Smith Jr, Alicja Malecka, Philip White, Marek Żytniewski, Daniel Kingsbury, Zbigniew Jagiełło, Krzysztof Lewandowski (appointed in 2009).

Pioneer Pekao today 
Pioneer Pekao Investments operations are carried out by a few dedicated companies:
 Asset manager (Pioneer Pekao Investment Management SA) – providing services to funds and to individual portfolios
 Investment Fund Company (Pioneer Pekao Towarzystwo Funduszy Inwestycyjnych SA) – a company which, according to Polish law, manages and represents funds (possessing legal entity)
 Transfer Agent (Pekao Financial Services Sp. z o.o. - owned 100% by Bank Pekao).

Pioneer - key people (as of 2011)

Management Board of Pioneer Pekao 
 Krzysztof Lewandowski - President (and CEO) of Pioneer Pekao Towarzystwa Funduszy Inwestycyjnych S.A. and Pioneer Pekao Investment Management S.A.
 Tomasz Orlik - VP (and COO) of Pioneer Pekao Towarzystwa Funduszy Inwestycyjnych S.A. and Pioneer Pekao Investment Management S.A.
 Ryszard Trepczyński - VP (and CIO) of Pioneer Pekao Investment Management S.A.

Fund managers
 Ryszard Trepczyński
 Sebastian Bogusławski
 Hubert Kmiecik
 Tomasz Jędrzejowski

Commercial proxies
 Maria Maciejec - chief accountant of Pioneer Pekao Investment Management S.A.
 Zbigniew Czumaj - chief fund accountant, heading funds operations and administration

Supervisory Board of Pioneer Pekao TFI S.A.
 Stefano Pregnolato – President of the Supervisory Board
 Wojciech Rutkowski
 Maria Schmidinger
 Renato Miraglia
 Zbigniew Sienkiewicz

History 
International:

13 February 1928 - Pioneer mutual fund launched in USA by Philip Carret as Fidelity Mutual Trust, the third US mutual fund (today: The Pioneer Fund).
1951 - Exceeded US$ 1m level (500 shareholders).
1967 - Pioneer launched Italian operations.
1969 - Entered Germany.
2000 - Merger (as target) with UniCredito Italiano Group (second-largest Italian banking group); company merged with UCI's Europlus.
2002 - Takeover of the UK hedge fund manager Momentum.
2006 - UCI merged with HVB (HypoVereinsbank), then Pioneer merged with the fund manager Activest.
2010 - Future plans and options for the investment group considered by the group owner Unicredit.
2011 - Report on cumulative growth rate of the flagship The Pioneer Fund of 1,043,985%  since inception in 1928.

In Poland:
1992 - First Polish Mutual Fund launched (now as a subfund 'Pioneer Balanced' within umbrella Pioneer Open-ended investment fund).
1995 - Second and third funds launched (now under the names: Pioneer Bond Plus i Pioneer Polish Equities).
1996 and 1997 - First 'Pekao Alliance' funds (then 'Eurofundusz' - operating till now under names Pioneer Stable Growth and Pioneer Bond).
2004 - First fund mergers.
2008 - Conversion of few funds to the legal form of umbrella fund Pioneer FIO.
2010 - Four funds launched, three funds merged (primary umbrella fund contains nine subfunds, most converted from prior stand-alone funds.
2011 - Launch of one fund.
Now - 14 stand-alone investment funds and three umbrella funds totalling 34 portfolios (total assets under management ca. PLN 17.8 m).

References

External links
 Pioneer Pekao TFI
 Pioneer Worldwide (Pioneer Investments home page)
 Unicredit home page

Hedge funds
Financial services companies of Poland
Financial services companies established in 1992
1992 establishments in Poland